Brunei, as Brunei Darussalam, competed at the 2000 Summer Olympics in Sydney, Australia.

Athletics

Men

Track and road events

Shooting

References
 Official Olympic Reports

Nations at the 2000 Summer Olympics
2000
Summer Olympics